Mary Kay O'Brien (born June 4, 1965) is an American judge and politician who serves as a justice of the Illinois Supreme Court since 2022.

Early life and education
Born was born on June 4, 1965 in Kankakee, Illinois, O'Brien grew up on a farm in Reddick, Illinois. She graduated from Reddick High School and went to Joliet Junior College. O'Brien received her bachelor's degree from Western Illinois University in 1986 and her J.D. degree from the University of Illinois College of Law in 1994.

Illinois House of Representatives
In 1996, she defeated Republican incumbent Stephen Spangler to represent the 75th district. The 75th district, at the time, included all of Grundy County and parts of LaSalle, Kankakee, and Will County, Illinois counties. From 1997 to 2003, O'Brien served in the Illinois House of Representatives and was a Democrat. The 2001 decennial reapportionment, added portions of Iroquois and Livingston counties. O'Brien resigned from the Illinois House of Representatives on December 17, 2003.

Judicial service
O'Brien was appointed a judge of the Third District of the Illinois Appellate Court to fill the vacancy created by the retirement of Thomas J. Homer. She was sworn in on December 26, 2003.

O'Brien was elected to the court in 2004 and retained in 2014.

O'Brien was elected to the third district seat on the Illinois Supreme Court in 2022. She was sworn into office on December 5, 2022. The Illinois Supreme Court appointed Linda Davenport to the vacancy created by O'Brien's election.

Notes

1965 births
Living people
20th-century American politicians
20th-century American women politicians
21st-century American politicians
21st-century American women politicians
21st-century American women judges
21st-century American judges
Joliet Junior College alumni
Judges of the Illinois Appellate Court
Justices of the Illinois Supreme Court
Democratic Party members of the Illinois House of Representatives
People from Kankakee, Illinois
University of Illinois College of Law alumni
Western Illinois University alumni
Women state legislators in Illinois